Gamal Abdel Nasser Mosque is a mosque in Cairo. The mosque is known for containing the mausoleum of Gamal Abdel Nasser.

It is located in El Qobbah district and as such, it is often referred to as "El-Qobbah Mosque". It is situated close to the building of the Ministry of Defence and Military Production, and the campus of Ain Shams University. Construction of the mosque begun in 1962, with the donation of the citizens of El Qobbah. In 1965, Nasser ordered the completion of the construction by financing the cost and supervising the design, which employs the modern Arabic architectural style. The construction cost reached 300,000 Egyptian pounds. Several social activities take place in the mosque, including the Qur'anic learning, training for orphan girls and medical clinic.

See also
 Lists of mosques
 List of mosques in Africa
 List of mosques in Egypt

References

Mosques in Cairo
Mosques completed in 1965
20th-century religious buildings and structures in Egypt